The denomination 700 for this year has been used since the early medieval period, when the Anno Domini calendar era became the prevalent method in Europe for naming years.

Events 
 By place 
 Byzantine Empire 
 Avar and Slavic tribes conquer Byzantine territories in the Balkans, occupying lands as far south as the Peloponnese peninsula in southern Greece (approximate date).

 Europe 
 King Cunipert dies after a 12-year reign, and is succeeded by his son Liutpert. He rules the Lombard Kingdom together with Ansprand, duke of Asti, as regent. 
 Raginpert, duke of Turin, deposes King Liutpert after an eight months' reign. He usurps the Lombard throne and puts his son Aripert in line for the succession.
 Pepin of Herstal, mayor of the palace, extends the Frankish Kingdom and annexes Thuringia. He turns the war towards the Alemanni (approximate date).

 Britain 
 King Geraint of Dumnonia receives a letter from Aldhelm, bishop of Sherborne, who insists that the Celtic Church comply with the doctrines of Rome.
 King Ine of Wessex begins to dispense with Wessex sub-kings and replace them with ealdormen (approximate date).
 The Eóganachta, an Irish dynasty centred around Cashel, begins to dominate southern Ireland (approximate date). 
 Hamwic emerges as a major Wessex trading town (approximate date).

 Arabian Empire 
 Mohammad ibn al-Ash'ath revolts against Caliph Abd al-Malik ibn Marwan in the Sistan and Balochistan regions (Iran).
 The Umayyad prince Abdallah ibn Abd al-Malik captures the Byzantine stronghold of Theodosiopolis in Armenia.
 Musa ibn Nusayr defeats the Berber forces in Algeria, ending resistance against the Arabs (approximate date).
 The African slave trade through the Sahara is so extensive that the town of Zawila (Tunisia) is established.

 Mesoamerica 
 Maya Civilization: Tikal Temple I, called the "Temple of the Giant Jaguar" (tomb of Jasaw Chan K'awiil I), Tikal, (Guatemala), is built. 
 Diquis culture (modern Costa Rica) starts in Central America (approximate date).

 North America 
 The Mount Edziza volcanic complex erupts in northern British Columbia, Canada.

 South America 
 The Wari people invade and occupy the Cuzco Valley (modern Peru) in the southern highlands (approximate date).
 The Moche culture in the northern part of modern day Peru collapses, largely due to environmental problems and/or political and social unrest (approximate date).

 By topic 
 Art 
 The Amida Buddha, a fresco in the kon-dō (Hōryū-ji Temple), is made (Nara period) (approximate date).

 Religion 
 Adomnán, Irish abbot, convinces 51 kings to adopt the Cáin Adomnáin, which defines the relationship between women and priests.
 Queen Cuthburh of Northumbria enters religious life. The Anglo-Saxon religious community at St. Mary's Nunnery is re-founded.
 Willibrord, Anglo-Saxon missionary, founds a mission post at Emmerich am Rhein (Germany), in the Utrecht Diocese.
 The Beverley Grammar School (East Yorkshire) is founded by bishop John of Beverley (approximate date).
 The Lindisfarne Gospels, an illuminated manuscript (Gospel Book), is produced in Northumbria.
 The famous Catholic Eucharistic Miracle occurs in Lanciano (Italy).

Births 
 Abu Muslim Khorasani, Muslim general (approximate date)
 Adrian I, pope of the Catholic Church (d. 795)
 Dōkyō, Japanese Buddhist monk (d. 772)
 Gaubald, bishop of Regensburg (approximate date)
 Gregory of Utrecht, Frankish abbot (approximate date)
 Ja'far al-Sadiq, Shī‘ah Imām and scholar (or 702)
 Kim Daeseong, Korean minister (d. 774)
 Paul I, pope of the Catholic Church (d. 767)
 Pirmin, Visigothic abbot (approximate date)
 Emperor Shomu, Emperor in Japan (d. 756)
 Vergilius, bishop of Salzburg (approximate date)
 Wasil ibn Ata, Muslim theologian (d. 748)
 Willibald, bishop of Eichstätt (approximate date)

Deaths 
 Asuka, Japanese princess
 Cunipert, king of the Lombards
 Di Renji, official of the Tang Dynasty (b. 630)
 Disibod, Irish monk and hermit (b. 619)
 Dōshō, Japanese Buddhist monk (b. 629)
 Fiannamail ua Dúnchado, king of Dál Riata
 Godeberta, Frankish abbess (approximate date) 
 Hasan ibn al-Nu'man, Muslim emir (general)
 Osgyth, Anglo-Saxon abbess and saint
 Reineldis, Frankish saint (approximate date)
 Asparuh of Bulgaria, Founder of the country of Bulgaria

References